Malinica ranjana is a species of beetles in the family Monotomidae, the only species in the genus Malinica.

References

Monotomidae
Monotypic Cucujoidea genera